Anna Mary Howitt, Mrs Watts (15 January 1824 – 23 July 1884) was an English Pre-Raphaelite painter, writer, feminist and spiritualist. Following a health crisis in 1856, she ceased exhibiting professionally and became a pioneering drawing medium. It is likely the term "automatic drawing" originated with her.

Artist and feminist
Anna Mary Howitt was born in Nottingham as the eldest surviving child of the Quaker writers and publishers William Howitt (1792–1879) and Mary Botham (1799–1888), but spent much of her childhood in Esher. The family moved to Heidelberg when Howitt was a teenager, as they felt Germany offered better educational options. Howitt showed early talent and entered Henry Sass's Art Academy in London in 1846, where her contemporaries included William Holman Hunt, Dante Gabriel Rossetti, Eliza 'Tottie' Fox and Thomas Woolner. In 1847 she illustrated her mother's book The Children's Year.

In 1850 Howitt accompanied her fellow artist Jane Benham to Munich, where she studied under Wilhelm von Kaulbach. She began to publish articles about the city that were later collected into An Art-Student in Munich (1853), and appeared as serialised stories with her own illustrations in the Illustrated Magazine of Art (1853–1854).

On An Art-Student in Munich, The New York Times (11 May 1854) wrote, "All that is peculiar to Munich, – its museums, galleries, festivals, and works of art, – or to German life, whether in high or low degree, and still more to the cultivation of the artist, is told in these pages with a beautiful earnestness and a naive simplicity, that have a talismanic effect upon the reader. It is one of those sunny works which leave a luminous trail behind them in the reader's memory." Howitt was under twin influences at this stage in life, being "connected on the one hand with the social and publishing circles of her parents, the hard-working pillars of the London literary establishment, and on the other hand with a group of forward-looking, feminist women of her own age."

The younger group of her associates consisted of the Langham Place feminists, notably her close friend the artist Barbara Leigh Smith: they joined Rossetti's Folio Club. Howitt made her exhibition debut at the National Institution of Fine Arts in 1854 with a painting inspired by Goethe's Faust. Her painting The Castaway (Royal Academy, 1855) was unusual in showing a woman who has sunk into prostitution. In 1856 she helped Leigh Smith to collect signatures for a petition that would lead to the Married Women's Property Act 1870. Family accounts record her distress over criticism from John Ruskin of her ambitious painting of Boadicea, which was also rejected by the Royal Academy. This may have contributed to her retreat from the professional art world, but her own account, published under a pseudonym in Camilla Dufour Crosland's Light in the Valley: My Experiences of Spiritualism(1857), suggests a neurological event, perhaps the onset of frontal lobe epilepsy.

Writer and spiritualist

In 1859, Howitt married a childhood friend and fellow spiritualist, Alaric Alfred Watts. The couple later moved to Cheyne Walk in Chelsea, a few doors from Dante Gabriel Rossetti. Howitt continued to publish regularly, most often in the spiritualist press. With her husband she co-authored Aurora: a Volume of Verse (1884). Her Pioneers of the Spiritual Reformation (1883) consisted of biographical sketches of the German poet Justinus Kerner and of her father William Howitt. She remained close to her brother, Alfred William Howitt, who had emigrated to Australia, where he became an explorer and pioneering anthropologist. Acting as his de facto agent in England, she secured equipment, vetted texts, and maintained academic ties on his behalf.

Though the whereabouts of her surviving oil paintings were still not known in 2019, a large number of Howitt's "spirit drawings" — images originated without her conscious control — remain in the archives of the Society for Psychical Research at Cambridge University Library and the College of Psychic Studies in London. Howitt was an inspiration to the artist medium Georgiana Houghton. With the expanding public interest in spirit-driven artists such as Emma Kunz and Hilma af Klint, Howitt's drawings are receiving greater academic attention.

Howitt's family was acquainted with the novelist Charles Dickens, who offered critical commentary on her writing.

See also
English women painters from the early 19th century who exhibited at the Royal Academy of Art

Publications
An Art Student in Munich (1853)
Aurora: A Volume of Verse (1875)
The Pioneers of the Spiritual Reformation (1883)

References

External resources
Rachel Oberter, Spiritualism and the Visual Imagination in Victorian Britain, PhD dissertation, Yale University, 2007
Black-and-white reproduction of AMH's 1849 portrait of fellow artist John Banvard (1815–1891): Retrieved 9 July 2011.
The text of An Art-Student in Munich online: Retrieved 9 July 2011.
The text of The Children's Year by Mary Howitt, illustrated by her daughter Anna Mary Howitt: Retrieved 9 July 2011.
A chapter on Anna Mary Howitt's travels in Munich in Heidi Liedke: The Experience of Idling in Victorian Travel Texts, 1850–1901. Palgrave Macmillan, 2018 Retrieved 17 August 2018.

1824 births
1884 deaths
English feminists
English women painters
Deaths from diphtheria
19th-century British women artists
19th-century English painters
English Quakers
People from Nottingham
British feminists
Drawing mediums
Quaker feminists
19th-century English women
Infectious disease deaths in Germany
Respiratory disease deaths in Germany